Adelaide of Metz (970 – 19 May 1046) was a French noblewoman.

Adelaide was born in 970 in Egisheim. She was a member of the Matfriding dynasty, descending from Matfrid. Her parents are unknown but she was a sister of Adalbert and Gerhard. She married Henry of Speyer, a German count and member of the Salian dynasty. They had two children, Judith of Speyer and Conrad II, Holy Roman Emperor. After her husband's death, she married a Frankish count from the Babenberg dynasty and had another son, Gebhard III, Bishop of Regensburg. In 1037 she founded the Collegiate Church in Öhringen.

References 

French countesses
German countesses
Matfriding dynasty
Medieval French nobility
10th-century German nobility
People from Metz
970 births
1046 deaths
11th-century German nobility